Ruth is an unincorporated community in Lincoln County, Mississippi, United States. Its ZIP code is 39662.

History
Ruth is located on the former Natchez, Columbia & Mobile Railroad and was first settled in the 1880s. The community is named for the daughter of Smith Felder, who opened its first post office in 1891.

In 1900, Ruth had a population of 20.

The Ruth School was founded in 1924 with funding from the Smith-Hughes Act. In 1941, the Works Progress Administration remodeled the school building. The school closed in 1961.

Notable person
 O.C. McDavid, managing editor of the Jackson Daily News from 1969 to 1977, painter, and sculptor

Notes

Unincorporated communities in Lincoln County, Mississippi
Unincorporated communities in Mississippi